Whatever We Wanna is the eighth studio album by American singer LeAnn Rimes, released June 6, 2006. The album has a more rock-oriented sound. The album was released and promoted exclusively in Europe, Taiwan, and Brazil. It was originally slated to be released in the U.S. (and even appeared in the US iTunes store briefly), however, the release was pulled due to the success of her single (from This Woman), "Something's Gotta Give" (which peaked at #2 on Billboard’s Top Country Songs), leading to an increase in sales of This Woman. A deluxe edition with three bonus remixes was released in the US on September 10, 2021, fifteen years after the original release.

Singles
Three singles were released from the album. "And It Feels Like" was released as the lead single from the album on May 5, 2006. The second single, "Strong", was released in Germany on June 23, 2006. The third and final single from the album  was Rimes' duet with Brian McFadden, "Everybody's Someone", which was released on September 25, 2006.

Track listing

Personnel
Credits for Whatever We Wanna were adapted from liner notes.

 LeAnn Rimes – lead vocals, background vocals
 Gregg Pagani – acoustic guitar, keyboards, programming
 Martin Sutton – acoustic guitar, keyboards, programming
 Charlie Judge – keyboards, programming
 Tom Bukovac – electric guitar, slide guitar
 Kenny Greenberg – electric guitar
 Dann Huff – acoustic guitar, e-bow, electric guitar, sitar
 Corky James – acoustic guitar
 Jay Joyce – electric guitar
 Jerry McPherson – electric guitar
 Jay DeMarcus – bass guitar
 Lance Morrison – bass guitar
 Jimmie Lee Sloas – bass guitar
 Brian McFadden – vocals
 Robert Bailey – background vocals
 Lisa Cochran – background vocals
 Vicki Hampton – background vocals
 Vinnie Colaiuta – drums
 Chris McHugh – drums
 Brian Pruitt – drums

Release history

Charts

References

2006 albums
Curb Records albums
LeAnn Rimes albums
Albums produced by Dann Huff
Albums produced by Christopher Neil